Daedalus Reef (also known as Abu Kizan) is a 400-meter-long and 100-meter-wide standalone reef in the Egyptian Red Sea situated about 90 kilometers from Marsa Alam. There is a small artificial island in the center of the reef, which hosts a lighthouse constructed in 1863 and rebuilt in 1931. Daedalus reef is a well-known place for diving because of good chances to see pelagic fish, such as hammerhead sharks, and an abundance of corals. In the high season one can find many dive safari boats staying overnight, anchored to the reef.

The 30 m (98 ft) lighthouse and the station is still active with 3 white flashes in a 2+1 pattern flashes every 30 seconds and only accessible by boats.
The lighthouse consists of a 30 m stone tower painted in black and white horizontal bands, and a 2-story quarter building for the Egyptian coast guard and Navy.

References

External links 
 wannadive.net
 http://www.redseariviera.info/en/To-Know/Deadalus-Reef-Lighthouse--Red-Sea

 

Reefs of the Red Sea
Lighthouses of the Red Sea
Underwater diving sites in Egypt
Lighthouses in Egypt
Lighthouses completed in 1863
Lighthouses completed in 1931
1863 establishments in Egypt